Mel and Tim were an American soul music duo active from 1969 to 1974. They are best known for the hit songs "Backfield in Motion", "Starting All Over Again" and "Good Guys Only Win in the Movies".

Career
Melvin McArthur Hardin and Hubert Timothy McPherson were cousins from Holly Springs, Mississippi, who traveled to Chicago, where they were discovered by Gene Chandler. Yolanda Hardin (who was Mel Hardin's mother and McPherson's aunt) along with their cousins Walita, Catha, Donny and Darris Maxwell, helped the duo with songwriting and publicity.

Yolanda, formerly a singer, signed them to a recording contract with her Bamboo Records, and they recorded their own song, "Backfield in Motion". The record was immediately successful, reaching number 3 on Billboard magazine's R&B chart and number 10 on its pop chart in 1969. It sold over one million copies and was awarded a gold disc. Their follow-up record was "Good Guys Only Win in the Movies", which was also the title of their first album.

Hardin and McPherson subsequently moved to Stax Records, for which they recorded a second top 5 R&B hit, the ballad "Starting All Over Again", released in the United States in June 1972. The record climbed to number 19 on the Billboard pop chart and stayed on the chart for 20 weeks.
Five months after its release, it was their second million seller. It was also the title track of their second album, released in 1972, recorded in Muscle Shoals and produced by Phillip Mitchell. Mel and Tim performed at the Wattstax charity concert that year, but later recordings could not repeat their earlier successes.

Tim McPherson died in 1986.

"Starting All Over Again" was covered by Hall and Oates in 1990 for their album Change of Season.

Discography

Charted singles

References

External links
Backfield in Motion lyrics
Discography
AllMusic

African-American musical groups
American musical duos
Family musical groups
Rhythm and blues duos
Male musical duos
People from Holly Springs, Mississippi
Musical groups from Mississippi
Musical groups from Chicago
Stax Records artists
American soul musical groups
American rhythm and blues musical groups
Musical groups established in 1969
Musical groups disestablished in 1974